Sean Justin Toomey (born June 27, 1965 in Saint Paul, Minnesota) is an American former professional ice hockey center. He was drafted in the seventh round, 136th overall by the Minnesota North Stars in the 1983 NHL Entry Draft. He played one National Hockey League game with the North Stars in the 1986–87 season, on March 7, 1987 against the Pittsburgh Penguins, going scoreless. Toomey later played three seasons in Europe, retiring in 1991.

Career statistics

Regular season and playoffs

See also
List of players who played only one game in the NHL

External links
 

1979 births
Living people
American men's ice hockey centers
Ässät players
Baltimore Skipjacks players
Ice hockey people from Saint Paul, Minnesota
Indianapolis Checkers players
Kalamazoo Wings (1974–2000) players
Minnesota Duluth Bulldogs men's ice hockey players
Minnesota North Stars draft picks
Minnesota North Stars players
Nybro Vikings players